R. V. G. Menon is a professor of engineering in Kerala, India. He was the principal of Government College of Engineering, Kannur. He was deputed as the director of Agency for Non-conventional Energy and Rural Technology (ANERT). He is the author of An Introduction To The History And Philosophy of Science, which is a part of the engineering curriculum in Kerala. 
 
Menon served as president of Kerala Sasthra Sahithya Parishad, the "Peoples' Science Movement".

References

Malayali people
Engineers from Kerala
Living people
20th-century Indian educational theorists
Educators from Kerala
Year of birth missing (living people)
Recipients of the Kerala Sahitya Akademi Award